Yang Zi (born 6 November 1992) also known as Andy Yang, is a Chinese actress and singer. She graduated from the Performance Institute of Beijing Film Academy (BFA) in 2014. In 2016, Yang was chosen by Southern Metropolis Daily as one of the Four Dan Actresses of the post-90s Generation.

Yang is noted for her roles in Home with Kids (2005), Battle of Changsha (2014), Ode to Joy (2016), Noble Aspirations (2016), Ashes of Love (2018), Go Go Squid! (2019), The Oath of Love (2022) and Immortal Samsara (2022). Yang ranked 73rd on Forbes China Celebrity 100 list in 2017, 24th in 2019, 13th in 2020 and 8th in 2021.

Early life and education
Yang was born as Yang Niao on 6 November, 1992 in Fangshan District, Beijing, China. Her father Yang Yunfei was a firefighter who worked in emergency rescue and disaster relief and her mother Ma Haiyan was a housewife. Her father named her Yang Niao to wish China a successful bid for the Olympics. From an early age, her parents accompanied her to various audition because of her love for acting. She first starred in Ru Chi Chu Shan at the age of 6.

Yang studied at Beijing Fangshan District Xingcheng Primary School, and Beijing No. 55 High School. In 2010, she was accepted to Beijing Film Academy. She graduated from Beijing Film Academy on 22 May 2014, with a major in performance.

Career

1999–2006: Beginnings and rise to prominence
In 1999, Yang made her acting debut by playing Zhou Qiong in Ru Ci Chu Shan. In 2002, Yang had a minor role as little Consort Donggo in Xiaozhuang Epic. In May 2004, Yang made her big-screen debut in the youth romance film Girl's Diary, playing Ran Dongyang, an elementary school student. She received a Best Child Actor nomination at the Tongniu Film Awards for her performance in the film.

In 2005, Yang rose to prominence playing Xia Xue in the popular Mainland Chinese sitcom Home with Kids. The series reached number one in ratings when it aired in China, and won the Outstanding Television Series (for children) award at the Flying Apsaras Awards and the Golden Eagle Awards. Yang became a household name in China since then. In March, she played little Bing Yue in historical costume drama Young Kangxi. In 2006, she reprised her role as Xia Xue in the sequel Home with Kids 2, though not in the subsequent installments.

2008–2013: Transition to teenage roles
In June 2008, Yang released her first solo album titled Home with Snow, which is named after her character's name in Home with Kids. In 2009, Yang voiced Ma Xiaotiao in the comedy animation series Mo's Mischief: Teacher's Pet, adapted from Yang Hongying's children's literature series of the same name. The same year, Yang played her first leading role in the youth drama Girl Rushes Forward.

In 2010, Yang starred in the friendship drama Boy's Diary. Then she was admitted to the Performance Institute of Beijing Film Academy. In February 2011, she starred in the family drama Love Comes Knocking on the Door, based on the novel Stepmother by Geling Yan. Her role as a rebellious teenager allowed her to successfully shed her image of a "child star".

In May 2012, Yang starred in the medical drama Angel Heart, portraying a kindhearted nurse. In August, she starred in the horror mystery thriller film Insisrence, and won the Best Newcomer Award at the 14th Golden Phoenix Awards. She also performed the official soundtrack, "The Quiet Rubble" for the film. In February 2013, Yang played the lead role in the period comedy drama King Rouge. In April, she starred in the family drama Dad Comes Home. In August, she starred in the romance drama Flowers in Fog, written by acclaimed Taiwanese writer Chiung Yao.

2014–2017: Rising popularity and breakthrough
In March 2014, Yang starred in her first war drama Battle of Changsha, directed by Magnolia Award-winner Kong Sheng. The series was set against the backdrop of the Battle of Changsha in 1939 during World War II. Yang played the role of Hu Xiangxiang, a nurse in the field hospital with different temperaments from the bright and lively girlhood to the aftermath of being a wife and a mother. The series was a critical success and was voted Best Drama of 2014 in major streaming website Douban after being broadcast on CCTV-8 beginning mid-July 2014. In May, Yang joined the second season of youth inspirational reality show We Are Young as a regular cast member.

In April 2015, Yang joined Dragon TV's star travel-reality show Sisters Over Flowers as a regular cast member. In August, she starred in the youth romance film Where Are All The Time. In October, Yang starred in the period drama Yangko Dance, which is a story inspired by the Haiyang Yangge folk dance that follows a man who gets caught in the complications of family, love and revenge. Within 21 days of its broadcast, the series became the Provincial Television Prime Ratings Champion in Jiangsu Television and Tianjin TV, maintaining top 5 positions till the end of its broadcast and has reached a total of 10 billion online views. Yang's portrayal of the kindhearted and patriotic young lady received positive reviews. The same month, she co-starred in the horror mystery web series The Ferryman.

In April 2016, Yang starred in the metropolitan romance drama Ode to Joy, which depicts the stories of five young women who comes from different social and educational backgrounds, but share a common goal. The series received critical acclaim and commercial success, and Yang gained widespread recognition for her portrayal of Qiu Yingying, a simple-minded girl from a small town. Yang was nominated for the Best Actress award at the China TV Golden Eagle Award, and the Best Supporting Actress award at the 23rd Shanghai Television Festival for her performance. In June, she starred in urban romance drama Perfect Wedding, where she played the role of a wedding planner. In July, she portrayed Lu Xueqi, one of the two female protagonists in Noble Aspirations, the television series adaption of the Xianxia novel Zhu Xian. The drama was a commercial success and accumulated 23 billion views online, the highest record held by a Chinese drama at that time. Yang gained wider popularity as a result and was nominated at the 22nd Huading Awards as Best Actress in the ancient drama category for her performance. In August, she co-starred in Crying Out in Love, a film based on the romance novel Socrates in Love by Japanese novelist Kyoichi Katayama. In December, she returned in the second season of Noble Aspirations as Lu Xueqi.

In May 2017, she starred in the historical romance comedy drama Legend of Dragon Pearl. Yang reprised her role as Qiu Yingying in the second installment of Ode to Joy.

2018-2020: Mainstream recognition
In April 2018, she played a guest role in the urban drama Women in Beijing. She then joined the second season of Chinese youth variety show Give Me Five, as a regular cast member. In July, she starred in The Destiny of White Snake, a fantasy romance drama based on the renowned Chinese folktale. Yang's portrayal of the innocent and naive snake spirit; as well as her voice-dub for the character, received positive reviews. In August, Yang starred in  the fantasy romance drama Ashes of Love, playing an innocent and lively fairy maiden. The series was a commercial success, topping both television and web ratings; and received positive reviews. Yang received acclaim for her acting and experienced a new high in popularity. On 26 November, she joined Sina Entertainment's year-end special project short film "The Most Beautiful Performance".

On 28 May 2019, Yang unveiled her wax figure at Madame Tussauds Beijing through an unveiling ceremony. In July, she starred in the e-sport romantic comedy drama Go Go Squid!, playing a talented computer major who is also a popular online singer. The drama topped television ratings and had been streamed more than 9.6 billion times in its timeslot and was praised for its transmitting positive and uplifting messages such as the pursuit of dreams as well as patriotism. The success of Go Go Squid reaffirmed Yang's popularity. She won the Best Actress award in modern drama category at the 26th Huading Awards for her performance. She also sang the ending theme song of the drama titled "Milk Bread", which reached number 2 on Billboard China Social Chart. She then joined the third season of cooking reality show Chinese Restaurant 3 as a regular cast member. In August, Yang featured in the disaster film The Bravest as the wife of a firefighter, the film achieved a box office result of 1.679 billion yuan  and Yang won the Most Popular Supporting Actress award at the 16th Guangzhou Student Film Festival. She was also nominated for the Best Supporting Actress award at the 35th Hundred Flowers Awards and the 11th Macau International Film Festival for her performance. The same month, she starred in the crime suspense film Bodies at Rest playing a forensics scientist. She then starred in the romance environmental protection drama My Mowgli Boy where she played a marketing executive.

On October 2020, she featured in the segment "Last Lesson" directed by Xu Zheng as part of the nationalistic film My People, My Homeland, and sang the promotional OST "My Homeland" for the film. In November, she starred in Hear Her, the first monologue series in China about women's rights. Hear Her is based on the format of BBC Studio's short-film series Snatches: Moments from Women's Lives, produced and directed by famous Chinese actress Zhao Wei. Her themed episode is called "Wish for Love". On 20 December, as the "Guardian of National Treasure" Yang participated in an episode of the third season of large-scale cultural exploration CCTV-1 show National Treasure.

2021-present
In February 2021, Yang played a guest role in Dt.Appledog's Time, the sequel to her hit drama Go Go Squid!. In May, she participated in the iQIYI detective reality show The Detectives' Adventures. On 1 July, Yang participated in the "Great Journey", a large-scale epic theatrical performance to celebrate the 100th anniversary of the founding of the Chinese Communist Party and performed in the inaugural skit "Breaking Dawn" along with several other artists.  In September, Yang was announced as one of the 6 recommendation officers for City Personification IP series, representing Beijing. Bigeye Comics and Weibo Animation collaborated to release comic strips of Yang and Yan Bo called Yang Zi X Yan Bo "Hutong Projector". On November 15, 2021, Yang Zi posted on social media, announcing that the six-year contract with H&R Century Pictures would not be renewed and on November 16, she established her personal studio. In November, she played the titular character psychologist He Dun, in the urban drama Psychologist, the television series adaption of Bi Shumin's 2007 novel "Female Psychologist", directed by Malaysian director Sam Quah. 

On 4 January 2022, Yang participated in an episode of People's Daily's "Dream Radio" Season 4: "Chinese Youth" as a guest host to promote Beijing Winter Olympic with Olympic gold medalist athlete Li Jianrou. On 15 February, she joined Tencent's "Olympic Report Star Radio" for the 2022 Winter Olympics and 2022 Winter Paralympics. In March, she starred in the romance drama The Oath of Love, playing a cellist. The series was a commercial success and was streamed over 3.8 billion times during its broadcast and won the "Tencent Business Breakthrough Award", one of the highest platform-level award. In July, she starred in the xianxia drama Immortal Samsara, playing a lotus fairy. The series was a commercial success and topped various web drama ratings and was praised for its rich depiction of the Xianxia world and traditional Chinese culture both domestically and internationally.

Her upcoming works includes the crime thriller film Drug Hunting, in which she stars as an anti drug policewoman and the historical fantasy drama Lost You Forever.

Other activities

Endorsements
Due to Yang's nationwide popularity, she has become one of the most in demand brand ambassadors in China. She endorses various kind of products such ase food and beverages, daily necessities and hygiene, mobile application and games etc. She also endorses many international brands including Chopard. In December 2019, Yang was named the promotional ambassador for the Beijing Television Spring Festival Gala 2020.

On 6 February 2021, she was announced as one of the VIP spokesperson for Tencent Video. On 8 December 2021, she was  announced as the Credit card spokesperson of China CITIC Bank. On 26 August 2022, Yang was announced as the global brand spokesperson of Chery Automobile.

Stage performances
On 27 January 2017, Yang appeared on the stage of CCTV Spring Festival Gala for the first time and performed the opening song "Beautiful Youths of China" with her sisters from Ode to Joy and TFBoys. On 16 September, Yang appeared as a special guest at Vision Wei's 10th Anniversary Concert in Beijing, performing "Looking for Someone" and "Our Little World" with the singer. On 15 February 2018, Yang attended the CCTV Spring Festival Gala and performed a comedy skit called "At Your Service" with Lin Yongjian, Li Mingqi and Dai Chunrong. On 31 December, Yang participated in the Hunan TV New Year Eve Concert and performed a song titled "Unsullied" which is the opening theme song of her drama Ashes of Love.

On 4 February 2019, Yang performed a comedy skit titled "Platform" at the CCTV Spring Festival Gala with Shang Daqing, Li Wenqi, Huang Xiaojun and Tong Dawei. On 5 February, Yang appeared on the Beijing Television Spring Festival Gala and sang the song "Childhood" with 3 other artist. On 31 December, she participated in the Hunan TV New Year Eve Concert and performed the song "Possible Night". On 24 January 2020, Yang performed "Meeting in 20 Years Again" alongside Angela Zhang, Xu Ziwei and Roy Wang at the CCTV Spring Festival Gala.

On 25 January 2020, Yang participated in the Beijing Television Spring Festival Gala 2020 together with her co-stars from Home with Kids and performed a song titled "Beijing, My Love". On 30 September, she participated in the  2020 CCTV National Day Gala and sang the song "Upward Light". On 17 October, Yang attended the 70th Anniversary Celebration of Beijing Film Academy and presented the opening speech of the ceremony. On 31 December, she participated in the Dragon TV New Year Eve Concert, performing "Unsullied", "One person Likes One Person", "Milk Bread" and "Us", the OST of her drama Ashes of Love , The Oath of Love , Go Go Squid! and Ode to Joy respectively.

On May 4, 2021, she participated in  CCTV's "Fight for Youth - 2021 May 4th Youth Day Special Program" and performed the song "Landscape Painting". On 31 December 2021, Yang participated in the Hunan TV New Year Eve Concert and performed the song "The Guardian of Princess Wendy".  On May 3rd, 2022, she participated in Henan TV "Long Live Youth" - 2022 May 4th Youth Day Special Program.

Public image

Influence
In September 2016, Yang was picked as one of the Four Dan Actresses of the post-90s generation along with Zhou Dongyu, Guan Xiaotong and Zheng Shuang by a survey conducted by Southern Metropolis Daily among 173 million netizens and 110 professional media and industry insiders. Yang ranked 73rd on Forbes China Celebrity 100 list in 2017. Forbes China listed Yang under their 30 Under 30 Asia 2017 list which consisted of 30 influential people under 30 years old who have had a substantial effect in their fields. In July 2019, after Go Go Squid! became a massive hit, iQiyi awarded Yang a KPI锦鲤 pennant. On 6 December, Yang was awarded the iQiyi Scream Goddess at the 8th iQiyi All-Star Carnival. She ranked 24th on Forbes China Celebrity 100 in 2019 and 13th in 2020.

On 3 January, 2020, The Beijing News selected Yang as the 2019 Entertainment Person of the Year. On 11 January, she was awarded Weibo Queen at the Weibo Awards Ceremony for the first time.  On 7 May, she was awarded the Most Influential Actress of 2019 by Powerstar China. Yang has appeared on the Forbes Asia's 100 Digital Star list, comprising 100 artists from across the Asia-Pacific region who have been able to stay active, raise awareness and inspire optimism despite the cancellation of physical events during the COVID-19 pandemic. Weibo Entertainment announced Yang as the Most Commercially Valuable Star of 2020. In 2021, she ranked 8th on Forbes China Celebrity 100. Yang was awarded  Weibo Queen for the second time at the Weibo Awards Ceremony.

As of September 2022, Yang has more than 60 million followers on Chinese microblogging platform Weibo. Her topic on Douyin has exceeded 90 billion views making her the first actress and only post-90s actress to do so.

Ambassadorships and social works

WildAid

Yang has been a WildAid Ambassador in China since 2019. On 20 December 2019, Yang participated in "Green Lifestyle" charity project jointly created by China Youth Daily, China Youth Online and WildAid and served as the Green Lifestyle Public Welfare Promotion Ambassador. In November 2020, Yang was announced as the Promotional Charity Ambassador of WildAid, advocating to protect wildlife. On 30 April 2021, WildAid and the China Wildlife Conservation Association co-launched a new PSA and billboard entitled "Bring Home Memories, Not Regrets" in China. The new campaign, led by Yang, calls on families not to purchase ivory and other wildlife products as souvenirs, ahead of May Day, a peak vacation and travel period in China.

She also lends her voice to WildAid's elephant program by starring in the "Be Their Role Model" campaign which asks parents to use their actions to set good examples for the next generation by not consuming ivory and other wildlife products. As the Convention on Biological Diversity Conference of Parties (CoP15) opened on 11 October in Kunming, China, WildAid, China Environmental News, and the China Wildlife Conservation Association launched a new billboard campaign series featuring Yang and 3 other WildAid ambassador. She led the COP15 Conservation Biodiversity Campaign, helping to educate the public on the serious consequences of biodiversity loss and calling on the public to take action to protect biodiversity by saying no to illegal wildlife trade.

Others
In March 2011, she served as the Love Ambassador of the "Girl's Heart" charity event, which aims to care for the growth of adolescent girls in millions of families in China. She then participated in "We Share a Blue Sky" charity project. On 22 April 2012, She participated in the 8th Beijing Youth Charity Film Festival as its Image Ambassador. In July 2013, Yang served as the Image Ambassador of Chinese Campus Health Action Student Vision Health Guidance Program and encouraged the students to do eye exercise.

In April 2017, She was announced as the Smart Action Ambassador for the China Children and Teenager's Fund. She then participated in a project sponsored by the China Foundation for Poverty Alleviation and the China Environmental Protection Foundation titled "Towards Ecological Civilization, Salute to Environmental Protection Pioneers" as its Public Welfare Envoy. On 9 September 2017, Yang joined BAZAAR Stars' Charity Night to raise money for Bazaar's "Accelerating for Love" ambulance project.

In January 2018, Yang participated in China Women's Development Foundation's "Mother's Postal Package" project as its Charity Ambassador to help mothers and families in poor areas. The same month, she participated in "Our New Era", a public music service advert produced by National Radio and Television Administration to promote youths and Chinese films and recorded a song titled "Thumbs Up For The New Era" and took part in its MV filming along with 20 other artists. In 6 August, she participated in the "For Hope+1" project organized by China Women's Development Foundation to help children with sJIA. She then joined the "My Hometown and Me" campaign jointly initiated by the Central Committee of the Communist Youth League of China and Weibo to help fight poverty.

In October 2018, Yang was announced as the National Mental Health Advocate. She participated in the "Watch Hunger Stop" charity project through Instagram. In November, she joined the People's Daily to mark the 40th anniversary of the reform and opening up of the "China has me" activity. Then on 16 November, she participated in the celebration of the reform and opening up jointly produced by the Beijing Committee of the Communist Youth League of China and China Youth Daily, recorded the song "The Future Me" and took part in its MV filming.

In March 2019, Yang joined "China Science Popularization Month" event and served as the China Popular Science Month Health Ambassador. On 5 September, She joined Public Welfare Fund for the "Philharmonic Listening Program" as the Ambassador of Love. She then participated in the "Beautiful China" education support project that focused on rural education. On 1 November, China Fire and Rescue announced Yang as the National Fire Prevention Public Welfare Messenger. On 17 November 2019, She participated in BAZAAR Stars' Charity Night and performed a song titled "Mercury" to support an aesthetic education charity project.

In January 2020, National Anti-fraud Center announced Yang as their Guardian Ambassador. On 9 March, Yang participated in "China Science Popularization Month" event and was named as the China Popular Science Month Anti-epidemic Science Ambassador. In April, she participated in World Health Organization's anti-epidemic welfare activities. On 17 October, the 7th National Poverty Alleviation Day, she was invited to work as an Advocate for the China Foundation for Poverty Alleviation to help alleviate poverty. On 28 August 28, the Supreme People's Court and the People's Court released a mini-video on the popularity of the Public Welfare Act of the Civil Code and invited Yang to participate in the mini-video to explain the rules as China's first "Civil Code Ambassador". 

In January 2021, Yang joined hands with Han Hong Love Charity Foundation along with more than 40 celebrity volunteers to support the advocate and practice of public welfare everywhere. In February, she was invited to participate in a video series event as one of the Observer of Law for the Supreme People's Court. On 11 March, she was announced as the first "Campus Charity Ambassador" of the 11th National Youth Green Plant Adoption. On 12 April, Yang was announced as the Cybersecurity Education Promoter for the 6th National Security Education Day.

Then American cosmetics brand Origins and their brand spokesperson Yang have jointly launched Earth Month environment protection welfare activities in China. On 1 December, Yang and Psychologist joined hands with UNAID for an AIDS Awareness campaign for World AIDS Day 2021. On 4 January 2022, Yang joined hands with China Social Welfare Foundation as one of the public welfare ambassador of "Warm Heart Plan - Love for Farmers" project.

Philanthropy
In 2008, at the age of 15, Yang went to help children affected by the 2008 Sichuan earthquake with her father as a volunteer. In July 2009, she participated in a child star charity project, withdrew part of the project's fund and donated it to the China Youth Care Foundation and Western China Eagle Education Network to assist young students.

Her costume, a pink gauze skirt she wore in Ashes of Love was sold for ￥12,800 and the money was used in the Amity Foundation's "National Culture Companion Child Growth" project. In February 2020, Yang donated ￥500 thousand to help people affected by COVID-19 pandemic. In July 2021, Yang donated ￥1.3 million to relieve the damages done in 2021 Henan floods.

Following the outbreak of COVID-19 in Shanghai, China, which began on February 28, 2022, a grant assistance from the China Film Foundation funded by Yang and 3 other actor started in April. Yang donated more than 16 tons of food supplies and other daily necessities to help people affected by the outbreak together with Huang Xuan, Wan Qian and Wen Qi. In September, she donated ￥1 million to relieve the damages done in 2022 Luding earthquake. On the official website of China Foundation for Poverty Alleviation, their 2021 Rural Development Annual Report revealed that Yang Zi Studio has become one of their donation partner.

Filmography

Film

Television series

Short film

Variety show

Discography

Albums

Soundtracks

Other appearances

Awards and nominations

Forbes China Celebrity 100

Others

Footnotes

Notes

References

External links

 
 
 

1992 births
Living people
21st-century Chinese actresses
Chinese television actresses
Chinese film actresses
Chinese child actresses
Chinese voice actors
Chinese voice actresses
Beijing Film Academy alumni
Actresses from Beijing
Singers from Beijing